Marc Bélanger (born 1950) is a labour union educator specializing in information technology and distance education via computer communications. He worked for the Workers' Activities Programme of the training centre of the International Labour Organization (ILO) in Turin, Italy, from 2000-2008. He was head of the Programme from 2007-2008.  The Programme operates the largest international union education school in the world. Its objective is to help build the capacities of unions in developing countries. The ILO is a specialized agency of the United Nations.

Bélanger is now the producer and host of RadioLabour news at www.radiolabour.net
 
He has a degree in journalism from Ryerson Polytechnical Institute, a Master's in media studies from The New School  and a PhD in computer communications from Simon Fraser University. His Master's thesis was on "Marshall McLuhan and the art of work". The subject of his doctoral thesis is "Online collaborative learning and the training of union staff in developing countries".

Before joining the ILO in 2000 Bélanger worked for the Canadian Union of Public Employees (CUPE).  For the first ten years of his career at CUPE he was a communications specialist assigned to support negotiators and local unions during strikes. During the last 15 years he was director of the union's computer department. It was during his time in the computer department that he organized the first local area network in Canada and created SoliNet - the Solidarity Network. SoliNet, established in 1985, was the first union-owned and operated computer communications system. It was used for the first online labour education courses, including university-credit courses, and international workshops. It spawned a number of important labour-related projects including the labour news service 
LabourStart. The website Bélanger created for SoliNet in 1993 (www.solinet.org) was the first labour website.

In 1995 Bélanger became the first person outside of the United States to earn a university degree (a Master's 
in Media Studies) completely via computer communications through Connected Education's program with The New School headed by Paul Levinson. Also in 1995 he became a founding director of Canada's Telelearning Network of Centres of Excellence (a national research network concerning distance education via computer communications funded by the Canadian government).

He has written on labour and technology, labour education, the digital development of 
African unions and the international labour movement.  He teaches courses on computer 
technology, both residentially and via computer communications, to unionists in developing 
countries.

The SoliComm project, which Belanger headed, began operating in 2004. It is a labour search 
engine and communications system. Its objective is to make the information on all the union and union-related web sites in the world easy to find and use. The system, which is a project of the Workers' Activities Program at the ILO training centre, also provides email and educational computer conferencing services for unionists.

He is the founding Artistic Director of the Turin Theatre Company.

References

ILO Training Centre Biographies

External links
RadioLabour web site
SoliComm
ILO ACTRAV-Turin
Turin Theatre Company

1950 births
Living people
Toronto Metropolitan University alumni
The New School alumni
Simon Fraser University alumni
Canadian trade unionists
International Labour Organization people
Canadian officials of the United Nations
Canadian Union of Public Employees people